House Of Metal is a Metal festival in Umeå, Sweden, which was conducted for the first time on 16–17 February 2007.

HoM has three different stages for bands of varying size and as well as an additional stage for cover bands. Every year appear about 25 bands from Sweden and the rest of the world. 

The 14th edition of House of Metal festival will be at Umeå Folkets Hus, 28-29 February 2020.

Lineup

2007 

Dream Evil 
Entombed 
Satyricon 
Hardcore Superstar
Soilwork
Persuader
Pain
 6th Awakening
 Apostasy
 Assailant
 Daemonicus
 Destynation
 Enter the Hunt
 Freak Kitchen
 Grabbe & Volymen
 Heed
 Hellfueled
 Lesra
 Lethal
 Live Elephant
 Meltdown
 My Own Grave
 Savage Circus

2008 

Nocturnal Rites 
Candlemass
Meshuggah
Naglfar
Freedom Call
Sonic Syndicate
Unleashed
 Caliber 69
 Dead End
 Decadense
 Easy Action
 Feral
 Ghamorian
 God Among Insects
 Grabbe & Volymen
 Heat
 Heel
 Plector
 Scar Symmetry
 The Final Crap
 The Manic Episode
 The Royal Jester
 Torn Apart
 X-bone Pirates

2009 

Amon Amarth 
Nifelheim
Torture Division
Opeth
The Haunted
Mustasch
Stormwarrior
 April Divine
 Arized
 Danko Jones
 Dawn of Silence
 Death Maze
 Grabbe & Volymen
 Guillotine
 Hate Ammo
 Hellmasker
 Los Bastardos
 Misantropic
 Moloken
 Redlight Attraction
 Remasculate
 Saint Daemon
 Sanctification
 The Final Crap

2010 

 8-Point Rose
 Apocalyst
 August Burns Red
 Behemoth
 Between the Buried and Me
 Bonnie Lee
 Coldspell
 Cynical Hatred
 Dead By April
 Fatal Smile
 Helltrain
 Hypocrisy
 Job For a Cowboy
 Lamb of God
 Lesra
 Marduk
 Necrophobic
 One Arm Short
 Persuader
 Raging Steel
 ReinXeed
 Revolverdog
 Scar Symmetry
 Sons of Guns
 Three Minute Madness

2011 

Aeon
Bullet
Dark Tranquillity 
Engel
F.K.Ü 
Ghost 
Impaled Nazarene
Samael
U.D.O.
 Bonnie Lee
 Crowdburn
 Godless Glenn and the Astro Zombies
 Hostile Reaction
 Iscaroth
 Katana
 Live Elephant
 RAM
 Ramin Kuntopolku
 Sad But True
 Scumkill
 Summoned Tide
 System Annihilated
 TNT
 Trident
 Triptykon
 Twins Crew

2012 

Adept
Amon Amarth 
Amaranthe 
Entombed
Immortal
Nocturnal Rites
Tiamat
Hail of Bullets
Krux
Souldrainer
 A Wish For A Maniac
 Bonnie Lee
 Crave
 Deals Death
 Disorge
 Doktor Diesel
 Dr. Living Dead
 Hellbound
 In Solitude
 Ki
 Miasmic Theory
 Pray For Locust
 Provoke Your Enemy
 Revolverdog
 Stoneload
 The Kristet Utseende
 The Whyrus

2013 

Aeon
Always War
Amorphis
Anaal Nathrakh
Assaultery
Aura Noir
Chaos in Order
Corroded
Daemonicus
Entombed
Extrakt
Festering Remains
Grand Nation
Griftefrid
Lahey
Maiden Norway
Mayhem
Miseration
Rage Invest
Seventribe
Sodom
Structural Disorder
Supernaut
Tankard
Vengha
Zonaria
Nifelheim
 Naglfar

2014 

Avatarium
Axenstar
Belphegor
Besserbitch
Bombus
Civil War
Cursed 13
Dogface
Enemy Within
Enforcer
F.K.Ü
Hatebreed
Hypocrisy
Immaculate
Man.Machine.Industry
Monoscream
Mörbultad
Napalm Death
Random Agnostic
Raubtier
Skull Fist
The Sanity Decadence
Thyrfing
Vanderbuyst

2015 

 At the gates
 The Haunted
 Port Noir
 Hardcore superstar
 Grand Magus
 Baptism
 Rotten Sound
 The Duskfall
 Watain
 Walking with strangers
 Finntroll
 Candlemass
 Binary Creed
 Vampire
 Deathbreed
 Rawhide
 Night
 Constructions
 Mesolimbic
 Revolver Dogs
 Midnight Caine
 Vanity BLVD
 Ufofolket
 Apocalypse Orchestra
 Helldorado

2016 

 Battle Beast
 Raubtier
 Firespawn
 Cut Up
 Naglfar
 Satyricon
 Destruction  
 Moloken 
 Defiatory
 Raised Fist
 Holy Moses
 Vanity Insanity
 Achilles
 Oro
 Helvegen 
 Hypertension
 Ensiferum
 Ramin Kuntopolku
 Skeleton Birth
 Forgetting The Memories
 Eterno 
 Ebrietor 
 In This Grey

2017 

 Asphyx
 Krisiun
 Vintersorg
 Dark Tranquility
 Ereb Altor
 Anthrax
 Pain
 Gloryhammer
 Wolf
 The Raven Age
 Scar Symmetry
 Grave 
 Purgatorium 
 Grid
 Gluttony 
 Mesolimbic 
 Hyperion 
 Nekrodelirium 
 Tragederia
 A Lethal Smile

2018 

 Meshuggah
 Nocturnal Rites
 Unleashed
 Danko Jones
 Sólstafir 
 Thunderstone
 Hulkoff 
 Dead Kosmonaut
 Asagraum 
 Vanhelgd 
 Dreadful Fate
 Utmarken
 Zornheym 
 Freakin’ Lizard
 Black Bay
 Incised
 Creeping Flesh
 Shiver
 Bleeding Utopia
 Enemy Inside

2019 

 The Haunted
 Necrophobic 
 Taake 
 Malakhim 
 Tiamat
 At the Gates
 Ross the Boss
 Clawfinger
 Attic
 Rotting Christ
 LIK
 Persuader
 Sadauk
 Devil's Force
 Cosmic Overlord
 Godhead Machinery
 偏執症者 (Paranoid)
 Deathheim 
 Awake the Dreamer
 Zephyra 
 Helldorado 
 Freak Out

2020 

 Freak Kitchen
 Vomitory 
 Burning Witches
 Darkened Nocturn Slaughtercult
 Onslaught 
 Bewitched 
 Shrapnel 
 Nervosa
 Feral
 Doro
 I Am Morbid
 Marduk
 Berzerker Legion
 Carcass
 Black Bay
 Curse 
 Dead Sleep
 Sanity Assassin 
 Siberian 
 Suffer Yourself

References

External links
Official site
House of Metal on Facebook

Rock festivals in Sweden
Music festivals in Sweden
Heavy metal festivals in Sweden